Marcus Child (December 1792 – March 6, 1859) was a Lower Canada businessman and political figure.

He was born in West Boylston, Massachusetts in 1792.  He came to Stanstead Township, Lower Canada in 1812, where he entered business a druggist. He was elected to the Legislative Assembly of Lower Canada for Stanstead as a reformer in a by-election in 1829.  He also served as postmaster for Stanstead and justice of the peace. Child helped secure funding to establish Stanstead Seminary and Charleston Academy.

Child did not stand for election in the general election of 1831, but did contest a subsequent by -election in 1833.  The Returning Officer proclaimed that he had been defeated by the opposing candidate, Wright Chamberlain, but this decision was subsequently set aside by the Legislative Assembly, which held that Child had been elected.  He was re-elected in the general election of 1834.

Child supported the Ninety-Two Resolutions and Louis-Joseph Papineau. Following the Lower Canada Rebellion in 1837, he was removed from his positions as postmaster and justice of the peace. In 1838, went to Vermont to avoid being arrested. He later returned to Coaticook where he established himself as a merchant and manufacturer.

In 1841, following the creation of the new Province of Canada,  Child was elected to represent Stanstead in the new Legislative Assembly. Child later served as senior magistrate for Stanstead County and inspector of schools for the Saint-François district.

He died in Coaticook, in 1859, from an inflammation of the lungs.

External links
 

1792 births
1859 deaths
Members of the Legislative Assembly of Lower Canada
Members of the Legislative Assembly of the Province of Canada from Canada East
People from Estrie